A Sidewalk Astronomer is a 2005 documentary film about former Vedanta monk and amateur astronomer John Dobson. The film follows Dobson to state parks, astronomy clubs, and downtown streets as he promotes awareness of astronomy through his own personal style of sidewalk astronomy. The documentary includes voice overs by Dobson himself promoting his unorthodox views on religion and cosmology.

Crews
 Produced and directed: Jeffrey Fox Jacobs
 Director of photography: Jeffrey Fox Jacobs
 Editor: Jeanne Vitale
 Music: John Angier
 Release: Jacobs Entertainment Inc
 Running time: 78 minutes

Review
"An inspiring film about an inspired teacher".. New York Times

Screenings
Shown at: Tribeca Film Festival 2005 ; Singapore Film Festival 2005; Maine Film Festival 2005; Avignon Film Festival 2005 ; Green Mountain Film Festival 2006

References

External links
 Official Movie Website
 "A Stargazer Who Exhorts the World to Gaze With Him" by Dana Stevens
 The San Francisco Sidewalk Astronomers
 

2005 films
Amateur astronomy
2005 documentary films
American documentary films
Biographical documentary films
Documentary films about outer space
2000s English-language films
2000s American films